The TRX 450R is high performance All-terrain vehicle manufactured by Honda powersports. It was produced from 2004 to 2014.

Engine
While the CRF450R and the TRX450R share the same displacement number, there are very few of the same components between the two engines. Initially, many people were disappointed because the first TRX450R was very weak compared to the CRF450R. Honda claims that it designed the TRX450R engine to produce more torque so that the engine was more suited for ATV purposes. In 2004 and 2005, the only interchangeable part between the ATV and motorcycle engines was the camshaft. In 2006, Honda overhauled the TRX450R engine to make it more similar to its motorcycle variant. This included a more aggressive cam profile, a larger bore with a shortened stroke, a new, short skirt piston and titanium rather than steel valves. In addition, Honda changed the carburetor from a 42 mm Keihin butterfly type to a 40 mm Keihin FCR. The first generation engine had a 10.5:1 compression ratio while the second generation had a 12:1 compression ratio.

Racing
Because for many years the four-stroke class displacement limit was 440 cubic centimeters, many racing sanctions bumped this number up to allow the new 450 cc bikes and ATVs to compete.

Along with the introduction of the TRX 450R, Honda announced, after 17 years, it would once again support factory sponsored racing. The 450R would be the first factory sponsored bike out of any of the other atv manufacturers. Honda's first sponsored rider on the new 450r would be Tim Farr. The sponsored Honda team would compete in the ATVA MX and TT Nationals in the Pro-Production class. The 450r's first national race would be the 2003 Baja 1000.

The 450R was off to a good start even before its public launch. The 450R was first across the line in the ATV class with a total time of 22 hours, 27 minutes, and 24 seconds. In the 2004 National MX races, the 450R would place 3rd overall.

Desert racing, and track racing would not be the only events the 450R would race in. The 450R would also compete in the  Grand National Cross Country series although Honda would not sponsor any riders.

Specifications

All specifications are manufacturer-claimed.

Model History

2005
Untouched from the 2004 version
Black plastics color scheme option added

2006
Electric start models added along with kick start models.
Engine compression raised from 10.5:1 to 12:1
Engine bore increased to 96 mm and stroke lowered to 62 mm
Maximum engine rpm is raised from 9800 to 9850
New transmission ratios designed for racing applications and trail use
Swing arm extended to help alleviate the "bucking" of the previous models. The "bucking" should be able to be tuned out with the correct (for the riders weight) spring. And by tuning the compression / rebound.
Rider position is lowered by 8 mm
Head light changed to a more "race-derived look".
Front knuckles changed making the front end "push".   Extending the swing arm will affect the front end. = "push"
Angle of engine changed.

2007
New White and Black/Flame colors on the electric start version

2008-2014
New Black/Blue color joins White on the electric start version
Style of and reposition of the auto decompression feature to other side of cam carrier
Black Wheels became an option with the Orange Frame/White plastics
Gas tank capacity decreased to 2.6 Gallons and addition of body plastic over tank.
2014 was the last year of production for the trx 450r

References

TRX450R